Ardozyga poenicea is a species of moth in the family Gelechiidae. It was described by Turner in 1947. It is found in Australia, where it has been recorded from Queensland.

Description 

References

External links 

Ardozyga
Moths described in 1947
Moths of Australia